Edgard Gnoleba Loué (born 27 December 1983) is an Ivorian former professional footballer who played as a defender.

Career
Born in Abidjan, Loué started his career in homeland club Africa Sports, before joining Moroccan side Raja Casablanca. He had a spell in Algeria with MO Constantine in the second division. Then he returned to Morocco to play for Raja Casablanca. In January 2006, he joined French club RC Strasbourg, who were in Ligue 1 at the time, on a four-and-a-half year deal. After his winter transfer window arrival, Loué Gnoleba integrated quickly into the first team, but ultimately is considered a disappointing acquisition by Racing.

Loué won the 2004 Botola with Raja Casablanca and would win the 2008–09 Tunisian Ligue Professionnelle 1 championship with Espérance Sportive de Tunis.

References

External links
Ligue De Football profile
Profile at Racingstub.com

1983 births
Living people
Ivorian footballers
Ivory Coast international footballers
Africa Sports d'Abidjan players
RC Strasbourg Alsace players
Raja CA players
Espérance Sportive de Tunis players
Ligue 1 players
Footballers from Abidjan
AS Gabès players
Association football defenders
Wydad de Fès players
MC Oran players
MO Constantine players
Al-Nasr SC (Benghazi) players
Libyan Premier League players